Jazeera Beach (also known as Gezira Beach;  or ) is a beach which overlooks the Somali Sea near the city of Mogadishu, the capital of Somalia.

Here, thousands of people gather to relax on weekends as part of Somali seagoing culture. The Jazeera Beach just a few kilometres south of the capital has gained popularity with the returning diaspora with hotels, restaurants, and boat riding springing up everywhere. This employs hundreds of youth and stimulates both the local tourism industry and the economy.

International tourists mostly from Turkey, America, the UK, Italy, Germany, and Malaysia visit Jazeera Beach. The beach offers tourists the chance to see the animal market in Jazeera where camels, cows, goats, sheep and wildlife are sold, as well as the salt mining processes located there. The features of the beach include a small island which can be accessed by tourists by renting a boat. The Indian Ocean coastline here features some of the most impressive beaches in the world. With pure sand, temperate waters and abundant wildlife, diaspora returnees and foreign investors are keen to develop this waterfront beach into a popular tourist destination.

A dry, hot climate is typical in this eastern African city. Rainy days come rarely to Mogadishu, and the wettest weather occurs from May through August.

The beach has also been plagued with people dumping their trash on parts of the beach.

References

Beaches of Somalia
Beaches of Mogadishu